Willy Lauwers, also known as 'Rupske' Lauwers, (16 April 1936 – 12 April 1959) was a professional cyclist.

He was born in Hemiksem, Belgium.

Important Results:

1954: second in Scheldeprijs
1956: second in Hanret criterium
1957: third in Antwerpen - Herselt
1957: first in Zesdaagse van Antwerpen with Reginald Arnold, Ferdinando Terruzzi
1957: first in Leuven
1958: first in Antwerpen
1958: first in Borgerhout
1958: first in Hoegaarden - Antwerpen - Hoegaarden

1936 births
1959 deaths
Belgian male cyclists
Cyclists from Antwerp Province
People from Hemiksem
20th-century Belgian people